Kimberly Mortensen is the NFHS (United States High School) record holder in the 3200 meter run. Her 9:48.59, run at Cerritos College In Norwalk, California on May 24, 1996 has stood since, including surviving the four year close assault by Jordan Hasay. Her performance, in the qualifying meet for the California Interscholastic Federation State Championships capped an exceptional Senior year at Thousand Oaks High School. She was the third athlete from suburban Ventura County to be named both the Gatorade Player of the Year and the Track and Field News High School Athlete of the Year, a list that includes one time teammate Marion Jones. Earlier in that same season, Mortensen had won the Foot Locker Cross Country Championships.  Following her record race, she went on to win the California State Championship race a week later in 9:52.80. Her then championship record race still is the #4 high school time ever, only superseded by Hasay and Laurynne Chetelat's exceptional battle in the 2008 version of that same meet.

Mortensen continued to UCLA but her athletic career was cut short by injuries.

Mortensen is now a Learning Specialist at Oaks Christian High School
Kim Mortensen is now married to Justin Newman and they have 3 children. They both work at Oaks Christian School. Kim is a middle school Learning Specialist and her husband, Justin, is a US history teacher for 8th grade.

References

External links
Daily News Article
CoachR Interview with Jack Farrell--Mortensen's High School Coach

Year of birth missing (living people)
Living people
American female middle-distance runners
People from Westlake Village, California
UCLA Bruins women's track and field athletes
Track and field athletes from California
Sportspeople from Ventura County, California